Maćkowiak is a Polish surname. It is derived from the given name Maciek, a diminutive of Maciej. The surname may refer to:

 Anton Mackowiak (1922–2013), German wrestler
 Jędrzej Maćkowiak (born 1992), Polish volleyball player
 Jules Mackowiak (1916-unknown), French canoeist
 Mateusz Maćkowiak, Polish footballer
 Rob Mackowiak (born 1976), American baseball player
 Robert Maćkowiak (born 1970), Polish athlete

References

See also
 

Polish-language surnames
Surnames from given names